The Philippine swiftlet (Aerodramus mearnsi, formerly Collocalia mearnsi) is a species of swift in the family Apodidae. It is endemic to the Philippines.

Its natural habitats are subtropical or tropical dry forests, subtropical or tropical moist lowland forests, and subtropical or tropical moist montane forests.

References

 BirdLife International 2004.  Aerodramus mearnsi.   2006 IUCN Red List of Threatened Species.   Downloaded on 24 July 2007.

grey-rumped swiftlet
Endemic birds of the Philippines
grey-rumped swiftlet
Taxa named by Harry C. Oberholser
Taxonomy articles created by Polbot